The Phalon-Sawaw Democratic Party (PSDP), also spelled Phlone-Sqaw Democratic Party, is a Karen political party in Myanmar.

History
The party was established in 2010. In the 2010 general elections it put forward four candidates for the House of Nationalities, winning three seats. Two of its five candidates were elected to the House of Representatives; it took over 70% of the vote in Karen State.

References

Political parties in Myanmar
Political parties established in 2010
2010 establishments in Myanmar